The Popish Recusants Act 1605 (3 Jac.1, c. 4) was an act of the Parliament of England which quickly followed the Gunpowder Plot of the same year, an attempt by English Roman Catholics to assassinate King James I and many of the Parliament.

The Act forbade Roman Catholics from practising the professions of law and medicine and from acting as a guardian or trustee; and it allowed magistrates to search their houses for arms. The Act also provided a new oath of allegiance, which denied the power of the Pope to depose monarchs. The recusant was to be fined £60 or to forfeit two-thirds of his land if he did not receive the sacrament of the Lord's Supper at least once a year in his Church of England parish church.

The Act also made it high treason to obey the authority of Rome rather than the King.

See also
Praemunire
High treason in the United Kingdom

References

Acts of the Parliament of England concerning religion
1605 in law
1605 in English law
Anti-Catholicism in England
Anti-Catholicism in Wales
1605 in Christianity